Oronde is a given name. Notable people with the given name include:

Oronde Ash (born 1976), Vincentian footballer
Oronde Bascome (born 1988), Bermudian cricketer
Oronde Gadsden (born 1971), American football player

See also
Jamael Orondé "Rondé" Barber (born 1975), American football player